Charles Goodall may refer to:

 Charles Goodall (cricketer) (1782–1872), English cricketer 
 Charles Goodall (poet) (1671–1689), English poet
 Charles Miner Goodall (1824–1899), California entrepreneur

Charles Goodall (assistant to vincent robertson, the founder of the refrigerator)1625-1643